Marina Tognetti is an Italian entrepreneur and business executive based in Amsterdam. She is the founder and CEO of Myngle, an online platform that offers live language education through video conferencing in 45 different languages.

Education and career 
Marina Tognetti graduated cum laude in Business & Economics from the Luiss Guido Carli University in Rome, after which she earned an MBA at INSEAD in Fontainebleau, France. She lived and worked in different countries, and spent one year traveling through Asia. She speaks Italian, English, Dutch, French, Spanish, and a bit of Mandarin.

She started her career in marketing at Procter & Gamble in Rome, working on different consumer brands. She then moved to The Netherlands where she worked for Philips in Eindhoven, responsible for consumer monitors for South Europe. After her MBA at INSEAD, she joined Sara Lee in the division Coffee and Grocery, where she became first Marketing Director for Out of Home in Paris, France, then moved back to The Netherlands as Director of New Products. She then joined The Boston Consulting Group. She decided to do some hands-on experience in the Internet, joining eBay, after which she was ready to start her own company and founded Myngle.

She was inspired to start a platform for language learning when she was having difficulty learning Chinese herself. She concluded that language learning would be much easier if people could learn languages as if they were living in the country where the language was spoken, benefiting from native teachers through internet connections. Her startup was able to expand with funding first from HenQ and some private investors and then from Rabobank in 2009. The company made the switch from consumers to corporate clients early on and is now primarily focused on business clients.

Recognition 
Marina is a regular speaker at conferences about women's leadership, entrepreneurship, and innovation.

She received many international recognitions for her contribution as a woman in technology:
2008: Accenture Innovation Award;   European Ventures Award; Benelux Ventures Award;   Female Internet Hero of the Week.
2009: 49 Most Notable Female Internet Heroes; Plugg People's Choice
2010: The Next Women
2012: Top 100 Women in Tech in Europe 
2014: GIT Girls in Tech of the Month
2015: 50 Most Inspiring Women Tech Leaders in Europe
2016: 50 Most Inspiring Women in Dutch technology Sector
2017: WEF Iconic Women Creating a Better World for All;   50 Most Inspiring Women in Tech Netherlands;   20 Impeccable Women in Business; 30 Most Inspiring Women in Business
2018: WEF Exceptional Women of Excellence; 20 Successful Shepreneurs to Watch; 20 Successful Businesswomen to Look For
2019: Elite League of Innovative CEOs;   10 Most Inspiring Entrepreneurs;   25 Creative Businesswomen Moving Beyond Excellence
2020: The 10 Most Empowering Women in Business

References

Living people
Business executives
21st-century Dutch businesswomen
21st-century Dutch businesspeople
Year of birth missing (living people)
21st-century Italian businesswomen
21st-century Italian businesspeople